Sketrick Castle is a castle situated on Sketrick Island near Whiterock, County Down, Northern Ireland. The castle is estimated to date back to the 12th century. Sketrick Castle tower-house and the passage to spring are State Care Historic Monuments in the townland of Sketrick Island, in the Ards and North Down Borough, at grid ref: J5245 6252.

History
The castle dates from the late 12th century. In the 14th century it was acquired by Sir Robert Savage. The Annals of the Four Masters record the capture of the castle in 1470 by an army led by the O'Neill to assist the MacQuillans. They took the castle and it was given to MacQuillan for safe keeping. It was intact until 1896 when a storm demolished much of it.

Features
Sketrick Castle was originally 57 ft high, 51 ft long and 27 ft wide, four storeys high, with a boat bay and a stone subterranean passage discovered in 1957. It has lintels running under the bawn wall to a chamber with a corbel over a fresh water spring. Parts of the bawn wall still survive to the north and east of the castle.

See also 
Castles in Northern Ireland

References

Castles in County Down
Ruined castles in Northern Ireland